DolphinDOS is a hardware expansion for the Commodore computers and floppy disk drives like Commodore 1541, 1541-II, Commodore 1571. It combined the disk controller side RAM expansion and firmware replacement with computer side KERNAL replacement and additional Parallel connection between the disk drive controller and the computer.

See also
Commodore DOS
Commodore 64
Commodore 128
Commodore International

Commodore 64